Staintondale railway station, also known as Stainton Dale railway station, was  north of Scarborough and served the hamlet of Staintondale in North Yorkshire, England.

Staintondale railway station opened on 16 July 1885 when the Scarborough & Whitby Railway opened the full line.

It had two platforms either side of a passing loop and a small goods yard to the west. It was listed in 1904 as being able to handle general goods, livestock, horse boxes and prize cattle vans. There was no permanent crane, although one is shown on the 1893 Ordnance survey map.

In 1937 the station was renamed as Stainton Dale (written as two separate words).

A camping coach was positioned here by the North Eastern Region from 1954 to 1958 and two coaches were here from 1959 to 1964.

On 4 May 1964 the goods service was withdrawn from the station, which closed completely on 8 March 1965. During the station's final year of operation its average weekly taking was £15 but the wages bill for the station came to £180.

The platforms and the main station buildings (used for residential purposes) are still in place.

References

Notes

Citations

Further reading

External links
 Staintondale station on navigable 1947 O. S. map

Disused railway stations in the Borough of Scarborough
Former North Eastern Railway (UK) stations
Railway stations in Great Britain opened in 1885
Railway stations in Great Britain closed in 1965
1885 establishments in England
1965 disestablishments in England
Beeching closures in England